Michael James Chaplin (Mike) NDD, RWS, RE, FRSA (born 19 September 1943) is a British artist, known primarily for his work in the mediums of etching and watercolour. He was guest art expert on the Channel 4 art programme Watercolour Challenge with Hannah Gordon.

Early life
Chaplin was born in Little Barford, Bedfordshire, in 1943, and attended primary school in nearby Sandy.

In the early 1950s, he moved with his parents and older sister to Harpenden in Hertfordshire. As a child, his love of art was already starting to develop. He attended St. Albans Boys' Grammar School, where he was a contemporary of Colin Blunstone and Chris White, who later formed the pop group The Zombies. Chaplin had been the guitarist in an earlier band alongside Colin Coke and Chris White, called The Markysparks, in reference to Markyate, Chris White's home town.

Career
After finishing his schooling, Chaplin spent a short time working in the art department of the school, before continuing to the Watford School of Art to study graphic design, gaining his National Diploma of Design. He followed this with a postgraduate course in Printmaking at the Brighton School of Art, now the University of Brighton Faculty of Arts. Chaplin's first work as a professional artist, while still a student, was to create woodcut pictures for the dust-jackets of books. He became a professional artist at the end of the 1960s, selling his first picture for seven Guineas. His earliest pieces were almost all in the medium of etching. The influence of Chaplin's background in graphic design is very clear in these first pictures, which are highly stylised, bordering on abstract. His love of architecture, particularly industrial, was also becoming apparent; an early etching depicts the workings of a disused power station, a motif which would recur later in his career.

After completing his studies, Chaplin moved with his wife Gay, also an artist, to Maidstone, Kent, where he still lives. They had one son, Nicholas (b. 1977) and one daughter, Briony (b. 1980).

In 1971, at the age of 28, Chaplin was elected as an associate of the Royal Society of Painter-Etchers and Engravers, one of the youngest people ever to receive this honour. He was later elected to full membership, subsequently serving as Honorary Secretary and Vice President, and is now a senior fellow of the society.

In 1997, having been an associate since 1993, Chaplin was elected a Full Member of the Royal Watercolour Society. He is also a Fellow of the Royal Society of Arts.

Chaplin appeared as the resident art expert on the Channel 4 programme Watercolour Challenge with Hannah Gordon, which began in 1998 and ran for three series. Chaplin also filmed an hour-long follow-up video, made to accompany the series. In 2002, Chaplin was commissioned to produce a series of handling sheets of watercolour techniques for the Tate Gallery to accompany the Thomas Girtin Exhibition (Summer 2002) and demonstrated painting techniques during the El Greco Exhibition at the National Gallery (2004).

2003 saw Chaplin filming for BBC Two's Open University Art History Unit, following in the steps of J. M. W. Turner and re-creating some of his paintings of the Lake District. In 2005 he worked with the Tate Gallery again, recording audio notes on the Turner exhibits for the gallery's Turner, Whistler & Monet exhibition.

In 2007 Chaplin was given the opportunity to use pigments that had been ground by J M W Turner into watercolour. Chaplin subsequently used the paint to film Turner's watercolour techniques for a permanent exhibition at Tate Britain in London. In 2011 Chaplin worked with the family of J M W Turner to establish the Turner Award for Watercolour as part of the Royal Academy Summer Exhibition, and was himself the recipient of the award in 2011.

Chaplin's work, both in painting and printmaking, is included in many public and private collections worldwide, including those of HM The Queen, HM The Queen Mother, ex-King Constantine of the Hellenes, Prince and Princess Michael of Kent, the Ashmolean Museum in Oxford, and the Fitzwilliam Museum in Cambridge. One of his murals also decorates the boardroom of the Daily Express offices.
 
He has had two books published, Mike Chaplin's Expressive Watercolours, and The Complete Book of Drawing and Painting. In 2010, he presented a DVD, The Challenge of Watercolour.

References

External links
 Mike Chaplin's website
 Books and DVD by Mike Chaplin
 
 Mike's film on Turner for Tate Britain
 Tate Shots - Short Watercolour Films

1943 births
Living people
British etchers
People associated with the University for the Creative Arts
English watercolourists
People from Bedfordshire